Bealoth is mentioned in the Old Testament as a city in the extreme southern region of Judah
In Joshua 15:24 it is listed as one of the cities of the children of Judah
In 1 Kings 4:16 it is noted as the location of Baanah son of Hushai, in this instance it is written as "in Aloth", but in the revised version is read as Bealoth

As a Bible name Bealoth means "citizen" or "cast under"

References
Hitchcock's Dictionary of Bible Names
Easton's Bible Dictionary

Hebrew Bible cities